Nynke Klopstra (born April 5, 1973 in Giekerk, Friesland) is a former Dutch judoka. She won the bronze medal at the 2004 European Judo Championships in Budapest in the -48 kg class. In this class she won six consecutive Dutch National Championships from 1998 until 2003. After her success at the European Championships she suffered from several injuries and decided to end her career on 30 October 2006.

Achievements
 1998 Dutch Nationals (-48 kg), Den Bosch
 1999 Dutch Nationals (-48 kg), Den Bosch
 2000 Dutch Nationals (-48 kg), Den Bosch
 2001 Dutch Nationals (-48 kg), Den Bosch
 2002 Dutch Nationals (-48 kg), Amsterdam
 2003 Dutch Nationals (-48 kg), Amsterdam
 2004 Judo Championships (-48 kg), Budapest

References

External links
 
 pictures

1973 births
Living people
Dutch female judoka
People from Tytsjerksteradiel
Sportspeople from Friesland
20th-century Dutch women
21st-century Dutch women